Urticarial allergic eruption is a cutaneous condition characterized by annular or gyrate urticarial plaques that persist for greater than 24 hours.

See also 
 Urticaria
 List of cutaneous conditions

References

External links 

Urticaria and angioedema